Koprivna is a village in the municipality of Oštra Luka, Republika Srpska, Bosnia and Herzegovina. The village lies just north of the Inter-Entity Boundary Line and is surrounded by it to the south, west and southeast.

References

Villages in Republika Srpska
Populated places in Oštra Luka